Gianfranco Polvara (born 29 January 1958) is an Italian cross-country skier who competed from 1982 to 1995. He finished seventh in the 15 km event at the 1988 Winter Olympics in Calgary.

At the 1993 FIS Nordic World Ski Championships in Falun, Polvara finished fourth in the 50 km event. His best World Cup finish was third twice in 30 km events, both in 1991.

Cross-country skiing results
All results are sourced from the International Ski Federation (FIS).

Olympic Games

World Championships

World Cup

Season standings

Individual podiums
2 podiums

References

External links

1958 births
Living people
Cross-country skiers at the 1980 Winter Olympics
Cross-country skiers at the 1984 Winter Olympics
Cross-country skiers at the 1988 Winter Olympics
Cross-country skiers at the 1992 Winter Olympics
Cross-country skiers at the 1994 Winter Olympics
Italian male cross-country skiers
Olympic cross-country skiers of Italy
Sportspeople from the Province of Lecco